KYOX "the Ox"  is a radio station airing a country music format licensed to Comanche, Texas, broadcasting on 94.3 MHz FM. The station is owned by Robert Elliott, Jr., through licensee Villecom LLC.

References

External links

Country radio stations in the United States
YOX